Summerhill is a subway station on the Yonge–University line in Toronto, Ontario, Canada. It is located on Shaftesbury Avenue just east of Yonge Street, with the entrance being at the north end of the train platforms. Wi-Fi service is available at this station.

Like Rosedale station, the next station to the south, it is currently among the least-used stations, with only  average weekday ridership. This is mainly due to it having no surface transit connections, except the parallel Yonge Street bus, and no major local destinations. The station has to rely entirely on the immediate Summerhill residential neighbourhood for passengers.

History

Summerhill station opened in 1954 as part of the original Yonge line. 

The tunnel connecting Summerhill station with St. Clair station (which is the next station north) originally ended immediately north of the station at Summerhill Avenue and continued in an open cut as far as Pleasant Boulevard. Various sections of this open cut were roofed over as the years passed, and since the early 1980s it has been entirely under cover, except when one block was opened to allow new construction above it. Passengers who look out from the train into the tunnel on this section can still see the sloping sides of the original cut, the stumps of lamp posts and trees, and the undersides of six bridges which still carry six streets (Woodlawn, Summerhill, Shaftesbury, Scrivener, Price and Rowanwood streets) over the line.

South of the station, the tunnel emerges to the surface at Rowanwood Drive. Originally, the line surfaced at Price Portal, but a one-block section from Rowanwood Drive to Price Street was roofed over in 2002 for parking.

In a February 2020 meeting of the TTC board, the TTC proposed a secondary exit for emergency use. The station entrance is at the north end of the station. The proposed exit would be at the south end of the station and emerge to the surface at Scrivener Square. There would be underground corridors to connect the platforms to the new exit, with one corridor running under the subway tracks from the northbound platform to the west side of the tracks.

By August 2022, construction had started to make the station's main entrance wheelchair accessible by adding two elevators, one each to the north- and southbound platforms.

Nearby landmarks 

The Catholic Pastoral Centre, which includes the offices of the Roman Catholic Archdiocese of Toronto, is on the northeast corner of Yonge and Shaftesbury beside the station entrance.
Just south of the station is the Canadian Pacific Railway’s former North Toronto station, now restored and repurposed as an LCBO liquor store. GO Transit’s Midtown line, proposed as recently as 2000 but not a current priority, would have seen that station reopened and served by commuter trains, bypassing Toronto's downtown Union Station, which would have turned Summerhill into a major interchange between local public transport and mainline railways.
The station is a meeting point for walking clubs heading east to the Rosedale Ravine via a staircase from Shaftesbury Avenue down to David A. Balfour Park.
The Toronto Lawn Tennis Club is also nearby.

Surface connections 

All connecting bus routes require a transfer and can be boarded at curbside stops.

TTC routes serving the station include:

References

External links 

 This shows the characteristics of the line north from Rosedale station. First the open cut, followed by the wider more recently covered section and finally the narrow original tunnel into Summerhill station and the arrival at the platform.

Line 1 Yonge–University stations
Railway stations in Canada opened in 1954